I3, I-3 or i3 may refer to:

Science and technology
 Core i3, a microprocessor line from Intel
 i3 (window manager), a tiling window manager
 Triiodide (I3−), an anion composed of 3 iodide atoms
 Intermud-3, an InterMUD network method between MUDs
 Axiom I3, a large cardinal axiom in rank-into-rank set theory

Transport
 Interstate 3, a proposed Interstate Highway in the U.S. states of Georgia and Tennessee
 BMW i3, an electric car by BMW
 Inline-triple engine, an internal combustion engine with three cylinders in a straight line
 LB&SCR I3 class, a British LB&SCR locomotive

Military
 , a Type J1 submarine of the Imperial Japanese Navy
 i3 fighter, a conceptual Japanese jet fighter proposed in 2010
 Mikoyan-Gurevich I-3, a heavy interceptor prototype fighter of the 1950s
 Polikarpov I-3, a 1928 Soviet biplane fighter

See also
 3i, a company headquartered in London, United Kingdom